Javier Montes (Madrid, 1976) is a Spanish writer. He won the José María de Pereda Award with Los penúltimos, his first novel. With La ceremonia del porno, he won the Anagrama Essay Award, together with Andrés Barba. In 2010, Granta magazine included him in its selection of the best young writers in Spanish. He has written for El País, Granta, Artforum and The Literary Hub, and his work has been recognized with the Civitella Ranieri Fellowship, the Leonardo Scholarship from the BBVA Foundation, and a stint as writer-in-residence at MALBA in Buenos Aires. He has also published La vida de hotel, Luz del fuego, and Varados en Rio.

References

Spanish writers